The Impact Knockouts World Championship is a women's professional wrestling world championship owned by Impact Wrestling. It is primarily contested for in Impact's women's division, though it has been challenged one time by a male competitor (Cody Deaner). It was introduced on October 14, 2007 at TNA's Bound for Glory pay-per-view (PPV) event under the name "TNA Women's World Championship"; it was later renamed "TNA Women's Knockout Championship" in 2008. The word "Knockout" in the championship's name alludes to the term TNA Knockout, which TNA uses to refer to its female wrestlers. Today, the company name is changed from TNA Total Nonstop Action Wrestling to Impact Wrestling and the Knockouts name is changed from TNA Knockouts to Impact Knockouts.

Being a professional wrestling championship, it is won via a scripted ending to a match or awarded to a wrestler because of a storyline. All title changes have occurred at TNA-promoted events; reigns that occurred on TNA's primary television program, Impact Wrestling, usually aired on tape delay and as such are listed with the day the tapings occurred, rather than the air date. The inaugural champion was Gail Kim who defeated Ms. Brooks, Christy Hemme, Awesome Kong, Roxxi Laveaux, Velvet Sky, Shelly Martinez, Jackie Moore, ODB, and Angelina Love in a ten–Knockout gauntlet match. Taya Valkyrie's first reign is the longest in the title's history, with 377 days. Gail Kim's seventh reign holds the record for shortest reign in the title's history at 18 hours, due to her relinquishing the title because of her retirement. Overall, there have been 61 reigns shared among 25 wrestlers, with three vacancies. Mickie James is the current champion in her fifth reign. She defeated Jordynne Grace in a Title vs. Career match on January 13, 2023 at Hard to Kill in Atlanta, GA.

Title history

Names

Reigns

Combined reigns 

See also
 Impact Knockouts World Tag Team Championship

References
General
 
 

Specific

External links
 Impact Knockouts World Championship

Impact Knockouts
Women's professional wrestling championships lists
Impact Wrestling champions lists